A for Prayagraj is 2021 book by Indian writer Udbhav Agarwal. Udbhav is a PhD candidate at Johns Hopkins University in Baltimore, Maryland having beforehand completed his schooling from Doon School and graduation from Vassar College in Poughkeepsie, New York. This is his first book and gives a Biographical account of Prayagraj, formerly known as Allahabad and its eventual name change.

Summary 
A for Prayagraj portrays in a part Travelogue and part memoir form the various stories of the erstwhile Allahabad from the eyes of a former resident. The author who was himself born and brought up in the city throughout the book revisits his childhood memories. Over the span of 128 pages he meets various people such a Lawyers, theatre artists, former and current residents and many such to tell the readers the various stories that have been lost to time. He describes how the city has changed itself. It deals with various subcultures in the city and its various vices such as crime and street law. At times it also dives into other things such as education and unemployment. Throughout the book we learn how one of the oldest cities of India, with at times glorious and at times horrendous past is quickly being subjected to abject urbanization. From 'tent city' to the holy rivers, from crime to romance, author covers every aspect of the city Prayagraj. This is rendering years of historical importance into in the words of the author "a battleground of historical cliches". But as we find in the book there are still traces left of the cities glorious past both in the city itself and in the hearts and minds of its residents. This biography of Allahabad is a modern story of an old city

Reception 
Hindustan Times said about the book, "Udbhav Agarwal’s precise detailing brings forth Allahabad-Prayagraj’s contradictions, its past slowly pushed to the corner by bustling malls even as its residents jostle hard to move out."

References

Indian books
Aleph Book Company books
2021 non-fiction books